Warsaw Voivodeship may refer to:

 Masovian Voivodeship (1526–1795)
 Warsaw Voivodeship (1919–1939)
 Warsaw Voivodeship (1975–1998)
 Masovian Voivodeship, created in 1999

See also
Voivodeships of Poland
Warsaw